Robert Samuel Houston (August 7, 1820January 5, 1902) was an American dairy farmer and Wisconsin pioneer.  He was a member of the Wisconsin State Assembly, representing Kenosha County during the 1874 and 1891 sessions.

Biography 
Houston was born in Charlemont, Massachusetts, on August 7, 1820.  He received a common school education, and became a stonecutter. He worked for one employer in Meriden, Connecticut, from 1851 until moving to Wisconsin in September 1857, eventually settling on a farm in Pleasant Prairie, where he took up dairy farming, selling butter and cheese (winning medals with both); and raised hay, corn and oats.

Houston served as chairman of the town board for the town of Pleasant Prairie, and as treasurer of his local school district.

He was first elected to the Assembly in 1873 to represent Kenosha County as a member of the Liberal Reform Party.  He drew 1,005 votes to 777 for Republican former state senator Francis Paddock (Republican incumbent Asahel Farr was not a candidate).

The Reform Party was a short-lived coalition of Democrats, reform and Liberal Republicans, and Grangers formed in 1873.  The coalition won the election for Governor of Wisconsin and secured Democratic control of the Assembly for the first time since before the Civil War.

Serving in the 27th Wisconsin Legislature, he was assigned to the standing committee on railroads.  This was an especially important committee during this legislative term, as railroad regulation was one of the key issues of the Reform coalition.  Their signature legislation was the so-called "Potter Law" (1874 Wisc. Act 273), which implemented strict new regulations on railroad freight and passenger rates and created the office of Railroad Commissioner to enforce and administer the new regulations.

Houston did not seek re-election in 1874, and was succeeded by Republican Rouse Simmons.  He ran again in 1876, but was defeated by Republican Walter Maxwell.

He was elected again to the Assembly in 1890 for a two-year term, this time as a Democrat, with 1,597 votes to 1,453 for Republican J. Cavanaugh (Republican incumbent Dwight Burgess was not a candidate). He was assigned to the committee on agriculture.  He was succeeded by Democrat Daniel A. Mahoney.

In 1895, a complaint was made to the state veterinarian that Houston's cattle had been contaminated with tuberculosis.  The state official came to Kenosha and, after testing, decided to slaughter 38 cows.  Houston raised a complaint after learning that the carcasses of the cows had been taken and sold for beef.  In the end, Houston was paid a small amount for his loss, but he continued his challenge and prepared a bill of damages, demanding full compensation.  He attempted multiple lawsuits through the Wisconsin courts, failing at the circuit court and the Wisconsin Supreme Court.  He personally lobbied the governor, Edward Scofield, and the Legislature, but was still unsuccessful.  The legal fight cost most of what remained of his fortune.

Personal life and family
Robert S. Houston was the third of six children born to David Houston and his wife Therza ( Upton).  His paternal grandfather, John Houston, served in the New Hampshire militia during the American Revolutionary War.

Robert Houston married twice.  He first married widow Lucy M. Stone ( Smith) of Whately, Massachusetts, on January 24, 1849.  She died in 1894, and Houston subsequently married Isabella Smith, a niece of his first wife.  He had two adopted daughters.

He died of edema in Milwaukee on January 5, 1902.

Electoral history

Wisconsin Assembly (1873)

| colspan="6" style="text-align:center;background-color: #e9e9e9;"| General Election, November 4, 1873

Wisconsin Assembly (1876)

| colspan="6" style="text-align:center;background-color: #e9e9e9;"| General Election, November 7, 1876

Wisconsin Assembly (1890)

| colspan="6" style="text-align:center;background-color: #e9e9e9;"| General Election, November 4, 1890

References

External links

1820 births
Dairy farmers
Farmers from Wisconsin
Democratic Party members of the Wisconsin State Assembly
People from Charlemont, Massachusetts
People from Pleasant Prairie, Wisconsin
American stonemasons
Wisconsin Reformers (19th century)
19th-century American politicians
1902 deaths